Vimanarama is a three-issue fictional comic book mini-series written by Grant Morrison, with art by Philip Bond, and published by the Vertigo imprint of DC Comics. Set in the United Kingdom, it follows the Jack Kirby-esque story of Ali, a British Asian man who must confront ancient monsters inspired by Indian folklore, as well as more mundane crises in his family and personal life.

Synopsis
It is the story of Ali, a young British Asian man awaiting the arrival of his unseen arranged marriage. A baby in his family accidentally opens a path to the centre of the Earth, unleashing ancient monsters hell-bent on destroying the world. Only the Ultra-Hadeen, a team of ancient and somewhat naive superheroes, can stop them.

Ali also must deal with several personal family crises, most of them influenced by the presence of the super-beings.

Influences
The story is a Jack Kirby-like (in particular his ancient astronaut series The Eternals) take on ancient Indian tales, for example the Vedas (a vimana as a flying plane, for example) and Mahabharata. It also has an Arabian Nights-style romance mixed with a large dash of psychedelia and general oddness.

Morrison has said that the idea arose when his research into Islam led him on to the ancient epic tales of India and some of the more speculative theories of people like David Hatcher Childress. He states: "I just liked the idea of taking all the pomp and high holiness of one of the world's great religions...and turning it into a Jack Kirby comic".

Reception
Vimanarama has received largely positive reviews. Critics praised the series's imaginative original setting, its humor, its bright and high-quality illustrations, and its vibrant story and characters, although some reviewers criticized it for attempting to fit too many ideas into too short of a series, leaving elements of the story underdeveloped.

Publications
Released in three parts, starting in February 2005, Vimanarama was subsequently collected into a single volume that was released in January 2006:
 US (Vertigo )
 UK (Titan Books )

References

External links
 Vimanarama at Crack Comics
 Vimanarama: British Pakistani saves the world in new comic!
 New take on life in Bradford article in The Guardian
Crack Comicks shows a frame from the comic, showing a vimana as a large flying saucer with Indian-type architectural features, in a dogfight with several modern jet fighters.
 Review of the trade, Comics Bulletin

Comics by Grant Morrison
Vertigo Comics limited series
2005 comics debuts
Ancient astronauts in fiction
Comics set in the United Kingdom
Hindu mythology in popular culture